Pavel Brendl (born March 23, 1981) is a Czech former professional ice hockey forward who last played for the HKM Zvolen in the Slovak Extraliga. He played in the National Hockey League with the Philadelphia Flyers, Carolina Hurricanes and Phoenix Coyotes.

Playing career
Brendl was a highly rated junior star with the Calgary Hitmen of the Western Hockey League, winning numerous awards and making the all-star team of the 1999 Memorial Cup. This led to him being drafted fourth overall in the 1999 NHL Entry Draft by the New York Rangers. However, Brendl's talent never translated to stardom at the NHL level, where he managed only 22 points in 78 career games with the Philadelphia Flyers, Carolina Hurricanes, and Phoenix Coyotes.

In 2006, Brendl joined the Swedish Elitserien team Mora IK for which he scored the most goals in the Elitserien during the regular season. After one season with the team he signed a three-year contract with Brynäs IF, also in Elitserien. Brynäs regards the signing of Brendl as one of the club's biggest and most spectacular signings in the recent history of the club. In June, 2008, Brendl signed with the Russian team Torpedo Nizhny Novgorod in the Kontinental Hockey League.  In the inaugural season of the KHL, Brendl led the league in scoring with 35 goals (with another Czech forward Jan Marek).

In 2010, Brendl signed with the KalPa of the SM-liiga.

Career statistics

Regular season and playoffs

International

Awards and honors

Records
 Calgary Hitmen's franchise record for goals in a season (1998–99) (73)
 Calgary Hitmen's franchise record for points in a season (1998–99) (134)

References

External links
 

1981 births
Brynäs IF players
Calgary Hitmen players
Carolina Hurricanes players
Czech ice hockey right wingers
Czech expatriate ice hockey players in Russia
Hartford Wolf Pack players
HC Oceláři Třinec players
HC Kometa Brno players
Jokipojat players
KalPa players
Lausitzer Füchse players
Living people
Lowell Lock Monsters players
Mora IK players
National Hockey League first-round draft picks
HC Neftekhimik Nizhnekamsk players
New York Rangers draft picks
HC Dynamo Pardubice players
People from Opočno
Philadelphia Flyers players
Philadelphia Phantoms players
Phoenix Coyotes players
SC Rapperswil-Jona Lakers players
San Antonio Rampage players
Torpedo Nizhny Novgorod players
Sportspeople from the Hradec Králové Region
Czech expatriate ice hockey players in Canada
Czech expatriate ice hockey players in the United States
Czech expatriate ice hockey players in Sweden
Czech expatriate ice hockey players in Slovakia
Czech expatriate ice hockey players in Finland
Czech expatriate ice hockey players in Switzerland